(A) Man Alone may refer to:

Man Alone (1923 film)
 Man Alone, a 1939 novel by John Mulgan
 A Man Alone (film), a 1955 Western directed by and starring Ray Milland
 A Man Alone (album), 1969 studio album by Frank Sinatra
 "A Man Alone" (Star Trek: Deep Space Nine), the fourth episode of the TV series Star Trek: Deep Space Nine
 Man alone, a literary antihero